The Macedonian mafia is a body of illegal gangs and criminal organizations operating in North Macedonia and within the Macedonian diaspora. The organizations are primarily involved in smuggling, arms trafficking, heists, drug trafficking, protection rackets, and illegal gambling. The mafia is composed of several major organized groups, which in turn have wider networks in Macedonia and throughout Europe.

History 
Criminal activities began in Macedonia while it was occupied by the Ottoman Empire. Informal groups of bandits with names like “Ajduci - Ајдуци” (Macedonian bandit groups) and “Bashibozuk - Başıbozuk” (Turkish bandit groups) engaged in war activities, robberies, kidnappings, and sometimes fought each other. The groups were named for their leader, but an Albanian bandit group also was active in Macedonia named “Arnauti - Aranuts” from Turkish dialect.

In the period from 1918 to 1942, Macedonian opium was one of the highest quality in the world, because of suitable soil and river alluvium. From the statistics of public documents of that time, the producers of opium between the two world wars satisfied 43% of the demand of the global legal processing industry, and later Yugoslav-Turkish cooperation covered 80% of the world countries needed, on an annual basis. This amounted to an average of 42 tons of opium, which was worth around 29 million dinars, which corresponded to the average budget revenues of the whole called “Vardarska Banovina”. That's why today Macedonia from that period is called “Balkan Colombia” considering the fact that eight tons of opium were smuggled in the Kingdom of Yugoslavia every year, it can be concluded that almost a quarter of the legal production was actually released into illegal trade market, if there are added other drugs and their illegal channels: heroin, morphine and codeine. In the USA, were was connection of the Belgrade and Skopje criminal organizations with the leading European drug transport networks across the Atlantic, then the increasing interest of the American diplomacy in the situation in Yugoslavia from the end of 1937 became understandable, where the opium trade was controlled by Italian-American Mafia, during the war these drug channels for smuggling opium into the US were cut off. In the meantime, control and primacy, was taken by other countries that were competitive in this business, the assumptions lead to the facts in that period, then were engaged and main characters of the Macedonian Revolutionary Organization VMRO that is also interesting fact.

In the socialistic period, when Macedonia was part of Yugoslavia, where active some typical illegal activities for that period: illegal gambling, usury, theft and robberies.

When Yugoslavia in 1991 was integrated, for some people destroyed, because was in sanctions, some criminal guys from other European countries were deported, and started to make criminal activities: illegal trading cigarettes, who were active in that illegal business and Balkan politicians, and soon arrived and drug and weapon trade, because of Serbian-Croatian War, Bosnian War. In drug trade some criminal groups were in business with: cocaine, marijuana and heroin. Some of leaders of criminal organizations, were also connected with police and politicians, and they made some criminal activities like: robbery, kidnapping businessmen, racketeering and protection racket businessmen and other rich and famous people, money laundering, usury, gunfights and assassinations.

After the War in Macedonia in 2001, many criminals were killed who were infiltrated in weapons trade, drug trade and war activities.

In 2006 Macedonian police in action "Jug" seized the David Beckham's SUV in Debar, the luxury BMW X5 was stolen in the Spanish capital where Beckham played for Real Madrid. It was among five vehicles seized at the Macedonia-Albania border in a raid on a human-smuggling gang.

On 7 January 2007, a shipment of 486 kg of cocaine who is traveling from Venezuela to Greece was caught at the Blace border crossing, in a truck that was transporting polycolor cans The value of the seized drug shipment was 92 million euros. The accused, arrested and convicted in that case was Stanislava Chochorovska Poletan and the truck driver. Macedonia Jails Cocaine Smugglers

In 2010 for planing the kidnapping of José Mourinho were suspected Macedonian citizens. Criminals had taken photos and videos of the football boss movements around his villa beside Italy's Lake Como, They had also been watching and filming him as he drove in his car and on the training ground at Inter Milan. Police believe they caught the gang, who have Mafia links, as they prepared to kidnap Mourinho, or raid the home in which he lives with wife Matilde and their two children. A gang of four Macedonians is suspected of carrying out two recent robberies of businessmen, stealing property worth more than £350,000. They are also believed to have been watching four Atalanta footballers as well as other Italian celebrities. Their plot was uncovered when police raided the gypsy camp where they lived.

After the arrest of leaders of the Frankfurt mafia in 2010, the largest Macedonian criminal organization who was created in Veles, and infiltrated in Germany and Austria with heroin trade, was destroyed the connection of criminal organization in North Macedonia.

The 2011-2012 Italian football match fixing scandal emerged on 1 June 2011 after a number of football related figures were arrested or placed under official scrutiny by Italian police for alleged match fixing. The list included well-known figures from football world, the group was accused of having fixed a wide range of Serie B, Lega Pro Prima Divisione and Lega Pro Seconda Divisione games. A key factor in this scandal was Macedonian citizens from Skopje. Rade Trajkovski Shtekli was arrested in 2011 in Athens and extradited to Italy, and Hristijan Ilievski nicknamed "King of fixing matches" was arrested in 2015 in Bergamo.

On 6 December 2020, two tons of marijuana packed in 200 boxes were stolen from a licensed cannabis oil production plant in Josifovo. On 7 December 2020 it was found in Arachinovo. The contraband has an estimated value of six million euro, or as much as 10 million if sold in the form of cannabis oil.

On 6 April 2021, in police action "Dvojnik" also called "Mafija" were arrested six Macedonian civil servants in Skopje for prosecution about the world scandal when the Interior Ministry was giving passports, to high-profile criminals from across the world. In the period between 2017 and 2021 over 200 high-profile drug lords, hitmen and money launderers were given passports by the Interior Ministry. Some of them were Jovan Vukotic, Igor Dedovic, Stevan Stamatovic, Radoje Zvicer, Ratko Zivkovic, Sedat Peker, Florian Musaj, Gerti Marku, Admir Murataj and Karine de Oliveira Campos.

In recent years, the Macedonian underground in Skopje is controlling the criminals group of  Grchec, Dukjandzikj and Gjorce Petrov and their rivals from Chento, Arachinovo and Kondovo, because of the illegal markets of drugs. In Strumica and Bitola, is a famous channel of international production of marijuana and illegal trade, All of these groups who are controlling the drug and weapons trade regions in country, are connected with region and European channels in the drug trade, who they pass the drug transportion from territory of Macedonia.

Groups

Skopje neighbourhoods 

 Gjorce Petrov gangs, drug trafficking, racketeering, usury.
 Avtokomanda gangs, drug trafficking, racketeering, usury.
 Aerodrom gangs, drug trafficking, racketeering, usury.
 Chair gangs, drug trafficking, racketeering, usury.
 Chento gangs, drug trafficking, racketeering, usury, contract killing.
 Gazi Baba gangs, drug trafficking, racketeering, usury.
 Drachevo gangs, drug trafficking, racketeering, usury.
 Arachinovo gangs, drug trafficking, smuggling, racketeering, usury.
 Kondovo group, drug trafficking, racketeering, usury, contract killing.
 Grčec group, drug trafficking, racketeering, usury, motor vehicle theft, contract killing.
 Dukjandzik group, drug trafficking, racketeering, usury, contract killing.
 Batinci group, drug trafficking, racketeering, usury, contract killing.
 Krushopek group, drug trafficking, smuggling, racketeering, usury, contract killing.

Other 

 Brothers Budisavljevic's group.
 Akica Totic's group.
 Stanislava Chochorovska Poletan's network.
 Daniel Johansson Petrovski's gang.
 Veleshta network.
 Frankfurt mafia.
 Naserligan.

Key people

Activity outside Macedonia 

The criminal activities of the Macedonian criminal groups are present on several continents.

Albania

Australia

Austria

In Austria the group named "Frankfurt Mafia" was active during the 90's and 00's, persons of this criminal group were dealing with drugs (heroine) in more than 18 of 24 municipalities in Vienna.

Belgium

Bosnia and Herzegovina

Bulgaria

Brasil

In Brasil Slobodan Kostovski "Kole" was arrested in 2018 and sentenced to 19 years in prison, for drug smuggling (cocaine) to european criminal groups, he escapes from prison the same year.

Croatia

Czech Republic

Denmark

France

In France Petrit Ame "Don Pietro" was involved in drug trafficking (cocaine), robberies, kidnapping, assault, shooting and managing with security in all casinos in Paris during 80's and 90's.

Greece

Germany

In Germany the most professional and largest criminal group from Macedonia based in Veles named as "Frankfurt Mafia" was involved in drug trafficking (heroin), they was active in Frankfurt, in Macedonian media this criminal group was populated with police action “Dirigent” that was operated in Veles. This police action was operated in three methods from Macedonian, German and Austrian police department, which lasted 4 years to break down this criminal group, because this group had more than 150 persons. The first police action was in 2009, police arrested group of five persons, and 2 of them were the bosses of the criminal group arrested in that action. In 2010 in Macedonia were arrested more than 30 persons, and 70 persons were arrested in Austria and Germany. In 2013 were arrested more than 50 people in Macedonia, Germany and Austria because of regrutation of drug dealers in that countries, and dealing with heroine in streets of Frankfurt and Vienna. The bosses of this criminal group were Zoran Manaskov “Skrsheniot” and Jordan Jordanov “Rkulot” from Veles. The function and organization of this criminal group started in 80s, and in that time they were active in thefts and bank robberies. In 90s they joined in illegal business of heroine, Jordan Jordanov regruted more than 500 people from Veles to Frankfurt and Vienna to work for this criminal group. The end of life of Jordan Jordanov was in 2010, when he was killed in restaurant named “Big Fish” in Skopje, from Toni Denkovski “Beli”, who was also big mafia guy in 90s, the second boss of this criminal group Zoran Manaskov was arrested in police action in 2010, and was sentenced to 13 years in prison.

Italy

Kosovo

Malta

Montenegro

Netherlands

In Netherlands Slobodan Kostovski "Kole" was arrested in Amsterdam in 1979 for bank robberies in Sweden, and the many years later he was involved in drug trafficking (cocaine) in the same city.

Norway

Serbia

In Serbia Slobodan Kostovski "Kole" was accused in case, when the police general major Boshko Buha was killed in 2002 at front of the Hotel Jugoslavija in Belgrade.

Spain

Slovenia

Slovak Republic

Sweden

In Sweden Slobodan Kostovski "Kole" was involved in bank robberies, in 1979 in Stockholm and Geteborg with Zeljko Raznatovic Arkan and Giovani Di Stefano aka (Carlo Fabiani).

Switzerland

United Kingdom

United States

In popular culture 
Macedonian criminal organizations have appeared in films, TV series, novels and video games. They have appeared in:

In film

Happy New Year '49 (1986)
Tattoo (1991)
Bal-Can-Can (2005)
Amerikanecot (2006)
Bunilo (2009)
Ova ne e amerikanski film (2011)
Zbor (2015)

In television

Trst via Skopje (1987 - 1990)
Zavedeni (2002)
Vratice se rode (2007, 2008)
Besa (2018)

In literature

Kriv Pravec (1995), book by Dimko Tasevski Ditas about the sex trafficking and prostitution in 90's in Macedonia.
Od Osaka do Dizhonska, book by Borche Trajkovski about the criminal scene in 90's in Skopje.
Gol Chovek (2005), book by Igor Dzambazov about the addictions in his personal life, with part in the book targeted to problems with owing money to moneylenders and debt collectors and how macedonian famous criminals from 90's, helps him to resolve that problems.
In media

This text is from reportaion of the Global Initiative Against Organized Crime in Macedonia and the region, published in 2019.

"In the territories of Macedonia are two borders: Bogorodica to Greece, and Jazhince of Tetovo to Kosovo. The documentation for border of Bogorodica marks it as “Tranzit point of drug trading” for heroine who is coming in region, like canabis who is going from Albania to Greece and Turkey. The border of Jazhince is “Hotspot of drug trading with other variants”. In this border is illegal rotation that criminal organizations are using for drug trading with trucks, tractors and horses. In documentation is also the interview of the police officer from 2018.

In Macedonia, the focus and their criminal activies of criminal organizations are in: Skopje, Veles, Shtip and Kochani.

The documentation of the Global Inititave Againt Organized Crime, is replied that criminal groups who controll Skopje with illegal tradings are controlled by ethnic Albanians. The forums of organized crime is: drug trading, vehnicle thefts, illegal trading migrants and other legal businesses who enable tradings and option for money laundering.

The 3 criminal groups from: Saraj, Dukandzik and Arachinovo have the protection from political parties.

Veles, is the city that has the most dealers in the region of Balkan.In that city, is the trading of heroin for canabis between criminal groups of Bulgaria, Albania and Greece.

The interestic fact, is that the confiscation of drug is so small in this country. This fact is considering that police is not concentrated to destroy with illegal activies of some criminal groups that are dominanting in this area.

In Veles, was created the group named “Frankfurt Mafia” that was the biggest trader of heroine in Germany and Austria. The illegal money of this criminal organization is “laundering” their money in night clubs, restaurants, hotels and casinos.

Shtip, is the coridor of poli-criminal activies and has the direct connection with Veles, and this part is controlled by ethnic Macedonians. Illegal activites in this city are: recetering, trading cigarettes, drug trading etc.

Kochani is also city that is part of criminal activites, and there are active activites with illegal trading od cigarettes and canabis. The criminal groups of Kochani has the connection with criminal groups from Bulgaria. Leaders of criminal groups of Kochani, are connected with business for security agencies, and they took “tax” to markets in city that the price was between 30 to 50 euros in a month. The guys who declined to pay taxes, they had problems with criminal groups: by burning their vehnicles and demolishing their markets. This criminal activity was destroyed when macedonian police made action “Detonator” in 2012.

Regional connections Macedonia is with Kosovo and Serbia.

Kumanovo and Tetovo are one of the biggest cities of Macedonia. The triagolic connection between Macedonia - Kosovo - Serbia is popular for illegal trading with oil, and this started in Serbia and Montenegro in early 90's.

Today, illegal tradings is performed with stock, food, jewelry, cigarettes and drugs. The drug trading, the biggest part is taking Albanian canabis, which goes to Preshevo’s valley in north and south, heroine that comes from Turkey to Bulgaria, and cocaine from Serbia. That are speculations that in part of Tetovo is based and creation of synthetic drugs, then in 2017 was found the illegal laboratory and confiscated 300 kilograms of amphetamine pills."

See also
 Frankfurt mafia

References

Mafia
Kumanovo
Macedonian diaspora
Transnational organized crime
Organized crime by ethnic or national origin
Organised crime groups in Australia
Macedonian-Australian culture
Organised crime groups in Austria
Organised crime groups in Germany
Organised crime groups in North Macedonia